The Sanquhar Declaration was a speech read by Michael Cameron in the presence of his brother, the Covenanter leader Richard Cameron, accompanied by twenty armed men in the public square of Sanquhar, Scotland, in 1680, disavowing allegiance to Charles II and the government of Scotland, in the name of "true Protestant and Presbyterian interest", opposition to government interference in religious affairs.

This symbolic demonstration, essentially a declaration of war, was among the first of a series of events that led to the Glorious Revolution and the end of the reign of the House of Stuart.

External links
 Sanquhar Declaration

1680 works
Covenanters
Political history of Scotland
1680 in Scotland
Religion and politics
Presbyterianism in Scotland
1680 in Christianity
1680 in politics
17th-century speeches
Sanquhar